Arid García (born Arid Jiobanny García Vargas) is a mechanical engineer of Venezuelan origin. He is best known as the founder of Tracto America and the former chairman of the football club Deportivo Lara.

Business career 

García began his career as manager of service distributor companies of agricultural machinery. García was soon given the additional responsibility of management of spare parts and two years later was assigned to commercial management. This experience gave García enough experience to found Tracto America and begin a new phase in his personal and professional life. His company quickly began to bear fruit as his customer orientated approach set Tracto America apart from other companies in the industry. Within two years, Tracto America received awards from Massey Ferguson and was beginning to lead the market of farm machinery in Venezuela. In 2009 Tracto America were responsible for over 60% of the market share and the company became an example for others to follow in Venezuela and Latin America.

García established Tracto America in Barquisimeto, Lara State. A leading company in the agricultural arena, Tracto America is dedicated to the import and distribution of machinery, equipment and spare parts for agriculture and construction. Today the company handles more than 60% of this market. García claims mantras such as, ‘Customer First!’, ‘The customer is right!’, and ‘The client should be treated with high quality of service!’, coupled with continuous improvement actions by staff and the implementation of marketing strategies has made this achievement possible. The company has received many awards and has been recognized by companies such as Massey Ferguson, Kuhn and Volvo in categories such as "Efficient and exemplary organization" in years 2009, 2010, and 2011.

Football 
Motivated by his passion for local football, García decided to support professional football in the State of Lara. García invested substantial time and money in the team, rescuing it from its predicted demise. García coupled his passion for football with his extensive business experience and adapted it to Deportivo Lara. After García's investment, the team soon improved their position qualifying for the International Cup in 2011.

Charity 
García's charity work includes sponsorship of children from deprived backgrounds through education and encouraging children in poor areas to take up sports. García has done extensive work encouraging children to make a better future for themselves through education and sport. His company, Tracto America, have helped to develop local schools by raising donations. To date they have benefited more than 600 children is this sector. In addition, García has set up three social programs helping schools with little resources, sponsoring children to gain a decent education and raising funds for notebook computers and equipment to help children achieve a better education. So far, there are more than 300 children between the ages of 4 and 14 years old in these programs.

Business philosophy 
García is a strong believer in the principle that there is no business growth without a relationship with its local community. His slogan that has led him through his professional career is "Organization, principles and values are all feasible" He has achieved a substantial amount in a short time but says: "We are still on the road and hope to project these successes in different areas and put a grain of sand in the future of our country."

References

External links 
 https://web.archive.org/web/20160304062530/http://www.aridgarcia.com/
 https://web.archive.org/web/20081205033153/http://www.massey.com.br/espanhol/campo/campo_assunto.asp?Pagina=4&totalpages=7&start=4&idEdicao=76&idAssunto=268
 https://web.archive.org/web/20081204041622/http://www.massey.com.br/espanhol/campo/campo_assunto.asp?Pagina=2&totalpages=5&start=2&idEdicao=72&idAssunto=344
 https://web.archive.org/web/20081123042557/http://www.massey.com.br/espanhol/campo/campo_assunto.asp?idedicao=67&idassunto=302
 https://web.archive.org/web/20081123020449/http://www.massey.com.br/espanhol/campo/campo_assunto.asp?idedicao=72&idassunto=344
 https://web.archive.org/web/20120206044320/http://www.massey.com.br/portugues/farmnews/Farm_News_Edition_3.pdf
 http://www.entornointeligente.com/articulo/1214226/Tres-plantas-de-tractores-listas-para-iniciar-ensamblaje-16012012
 http://www.ruedaventa.com/noticias/276.html
 https://web.archive.org/web/20120829111047/http://www.tractoamerica.com.ve/
 https://web.archive.org/web/20090612223612/http://www.tractoamerica.com.ve/detalle_noticia.php?id=7

Living people
Venezuelan engineers
Venezuelan businesspeople
Venezuelan company founders
Year of birth missing (living people)